Soganaclia viridisparsa is a moth of the subfamily Arctiinae first described by Paul Griveaud in 1964. It is found in northern Madagascar where it seems to be confined to the high altitudes of the Tsaratanana Massif.

References

Arctiinae
Lepidoptera of Madagascar
Moths described in 1964
Moths of Madagascar
Moths of Africa